Vincenzo Mustacciolo (born 17 March 2000) is an Italian football player. He plays for Paternò on loan from Acireale.

Club career
He started his senior career in Serie D with Troina. On 31 January 2018, he signed with Parma (in Serie B at the time), who loaned him back to Troina for the rest of the 2017–18 season.

For the 2018–19 season he joined Serie C club Siracusa on loan.

He made his professional Serie C debut for Siracusa on 25 September 2018 in a game against Paganese. He substituted Marco Palermo in the 81st minute. He made his first start for Siracusa on 21 October 2018 in a game against Potenza. He finished the loan with 16 appearances, including 9 in the starting line-up.

On 27 July 2019 he joined Ravenna on loan, again in the Serie C.

On 13 August 2021, he signed with Serie D club Acireale. On 4 December 2021, he moved on loan to Paternò, also in Serie D.

References

External links
 

2000 births
Footballers from Palermo
Living people
Italian footballers
Association football midfielders
Ravenna F.C. players
S.S.D. Acireale Calcio 1946 players
A.S.D. Paternò 1908 players
Serie C players
Serie D players